Soniya Nityanand (born 6 September 1962) is an Indian immunologist specialising in  hematology. She did her graduation and post graduation both from King George's Medical College, Lucknow. She later went on to pursue her PhD in Immunology from Karolinska Institute, Stockholm, Sweden in 1996.

Career 
In the initial phase of her career, Nityanand worked as an Assistant Professor in medicine in KGMC, Lucknow where she served from October 1991 to November, 1993. After that, she has been a faculty member at SGPGIMS from Nov 1993, initially in the Dept of Immunology and recently in the Dept of Hematology.

She has also been a visiting fellow in immunology and hematology at Karolinska Institute, Stockholm in the year 1991–1992.

In 2021, she was appointed as director of Dr. Ram Manohar Lohia Institute of Medical Sciences.

Awards 
Nityanand is a recipient of several awards:
Department of Biotechnology National Bioscience Award for Career Development for 2003–04.
Indian National Science Academy Young Scientist Award for 1990.
Dr JC Patel and BC Mehta award of the Association of Physicians of India for 2000.
Dr NN Gupta Gold Medal
Chancellor's Medal for the best Medical Student.

References 

Living people
Indian women biologists
Indian hematologists
Indian immunologists
Women scientists from Uttar Pradesh
Scientists from Lucknow
20th-century Indian women scientists
20th-century Indian biologists
N-BIOS Prize recipients
1962 births